is a Japanese weightlifter. He competed at the 1992 Summer Olympics and the 1996 Summer Olympics.

References

1968 births
Living people
Japanese male weightlifters
Olympic weightlifters of Japan
Weightlifters at the 1992 Summer Olympics
Weightlifters at the 1996 Summer Olympics
Place of birth missing (living people)